Il Giorno may refer to:

Il Giorno (newspaper), an Italian newspaper
Il giorno (poem) (1763), a poem written by Giuseppe Parini